The Shoaiba power and desalination plant is an oil-fired, combined cycle gas turbine power and desalination complex in Saudi Arabia on the coast of Red Sea, about  south of Jeddah. It is one of the world's largest fossil fuel power plants, and the world's third largest integrated water and power plant.

History
The construction of the first plant 1 of the Shoaiba power station began in 1985 and second plant 2 1995 (although there was a power generation and saline desalination plant in operation at the site as far back as 1985 with commissioning support from Stuttgart-based Fichtner Consulting Engineers). The ABB-led consortium built a power station equipped with three turbines, heat recovery steam generators and ancillary power generation equipment. The first stage cost about US$850 million. The first unit came into operation in July 2001. The other two units were completed in August 2003. The contract for construction of the second stage was awarded to a consortium led by Alstom Power. A multi-stage flash distillation water desalination plant was built by Hanjung (now Doosan Heavy Industries) in partnership with Bechtel. The desalination plant of shoiaba phase 1 and phase 2 has a capacity of 76800 tons/day. 2017 awarded ph4 ro plant to doosan, started full production on 2020 February 384000 m3 per day.currently all three plants director Eng Abdur rahman al aofi.

Technical features
After completing the third stage the power station consists of 14 units with a total capacity of 5,600 MW, which makes it one of the largest fossil fuel-fired power stations in the world. The last expansion was built by Alstom and is operational since 2012. The oil for power production is supplied from Saudi Aramco by tankers.

The power station is connected to the 380 kV grid. The power station provides the desalination facility with steam to heat the seawater distillers while reducing its own cooling demands.

Operating company
The Shoaiba power station Saline Water Conversion Corporation is aided by the kingdom of Saudi Arabia and is monitored by the power and water ministry.

References

External links

 Shoaiba Oil Fired Power Plant, Saudi Arabia. Power Technology

Oil-fired power stations in Saudi Arabia
Integrated water and power plants
Water supply and sanitation in Saudi Arabia